Beaconsfield (Boonwurrung: Kemgrim) is a suburb of Melbourne, Victoria, Australia,  south-east of Melbourne's Central Business District, located within the Shire of Cardinia and City of Casey local government areas. Beaconsfield recorded a population of 7,267 at the 2021 census.

The suburb has its own railway station.

History

The area was named after Benjamin Disraeli (Lord Beaconsfield).

Beaconsfield Post Office opened 1889 on Woods Street. It became the Beaconsfield Post Office in 1916 and was used for many years as a café, but was demolished in late October 2021.

The earlier Beaconsfield Railway Station Post Office opened on 1 January 1883.

In 1891 an area of Beaconsfield was renamed "Beaconsfield Upper" and around 1902 the Beaconsfield Railway Station was renamed to "Beaconsfield".

Facilities

The suburb has some small shopping centres such as "Beaconsfield Shopping Plaza" with shops such as an Aldi, Woolworths, bakeries, a post office, chemist, cafés and takeaway food shops, and the nearby "Beaconsfield Hub". Schools include Beaconsfield Primary, and St Francis Xavier College (Beaconsfield Campus). There are many cafés, restaurants and hairdressers around the commercial shopping area. The Beaconsfield CFA (Country Fire Authority) has their fire station in Woods Street.There are toilets in the Main Street, however they are not maintained and they often smell.

The Akoonah Park Market is held every Sunday, and is very popular with local Berwick and Beaconsfield shoppers.

Historical Places of Interest 
War cenotaph located on the corner of Woods Street and Old Princes Highway. It was unveiled in 1920.

Railway house built in 1888, near Beaconsfield Train Station. The large bunya bunya pine to the front of the property is listed as a significant tree.

Shipwatcher's lookout is marked by a large granite rock and plaque, on the side of Cooinda Road.

Parks 
Beaconsfield Flora and Fauna Reserve on the Beaconsfield Emerald Road.

Beaconsfield Park located on the corner of Beaconsfield Emerald Road and the Old Princes Highway.

Berwick Views Wetlands beside Beaconsfield Emerald Road and Fieldstone Boulevard

Bob Burgess Reserve on Old Princes Highway, and is opposite Beaconsfield Park.

Jim Parkes Reserve on the corner of Souter and Horner Street.

Kath Roberts Reserve on Kathleen Court.

Sports clubs
The town has an Australian Rules football club and a netball club that compete in the South East Football Netball League.

There is also a cricket club and a tennis club.

Community 
Although close to the nowadays much more bustling Berwick, the area has retained a friendly, country Australia feeling within the community. The Beaconsfield Progress Association, who publish the "Beaconsfield Banner", and other such community groups, help contribute to this community spirit.

Beaconsfield is affectionately called "Beacy" by locals.

Notable people
 Vanessa Amorosi – professional singer who had several Top 40 chart hits.
 Len Maddocks – former Australian cricketer.
 Brendan Fevola – Australian rules footballer.
 Austinn Jones – Australian rules footballer.
 Chris Newman - Australian rules footballer.

See also
 City of Berwick – Parts of Beaconsfield were previously within this former local government area.
 Shire of Pakenham – Parts of Beaconsfield were previously within this former local government area.
 Beaconsfield railway station

References

External links
Australian Places – Beaconsfield
 Beaconsfield Progress Association, Inc.
Beaconsfield Primary
St Francis Xavier College
Beaconsfield Pharmacy
Beaconsfield Tennis Club
Beaconsfield Cricket Club
Beaconsfield Football Club
Beaconsfield Fitness Centre
Beaconsfield Hub
The Medical Clinic
Akoonah Park Market

Suburbs of Melbourne
Suburbs of the City of Casey
Suburbs of the Shire of Cardinia